William Smyth D.D. (1582 – 6 May 1658) was an English academic administrator at the University of Oxford.

Smyth was elected Warden of Wadham College, Oxford on 24 March 1616/17, a post he held until he resigned on 7 September 1635.
While Warden at Wadham College, Smyth was also Vice-Chancellor of Oxford University from 1630 until 1632.
He died on 6 May 1658.

References

1658 deaths
Wardens of Wadham College, Oxford
Vice-Chancellors of the University of Oxford
1582 births